, also known as Udo, is a Japanese musician and comedian. He used to be a member of the Japanese band UltraCats and is a member of the owarai group .

See also 
 List of Japanese comedians

References

External links 
 The Kyai information at Asaikikaku Co.Ltd.

1970 births
Japanese comedians
Japanese male musicians
Japanese musicians
Living people
Musicians from Yamagata Prefecture
People from Yamagata Prefecture